German submarine U-1235 was a Type IXC/40 U-boat of Nazi Germany's Kriegsmarine during World War II. The submarine was laid down on 25 May 1943 at the Deutsche Werft yard at Hamburg, launched on 25 January 1944, and commissioned on 17 May 1944. She served with 31st U-boat Flotilla, a training unit, and with 33rd U-boat Flotilla from 1 December 1944 until 15 April 1945.

Design
German Type IXC/40 submarines were slightly larger than the original Type IXCs. U-1235 had a displacement of  when at the surface and  while submerged. She had two shafts and two  propellers.

U-1235 was fitted with six  torpedo tubes (four fitted at the bow and two at the stern), 22 torpedoes, one  SK C/32 naval gun, 180 rounds, and a  Flak M42 as well as two twin  C/30 anti-aircraft guns. The boat had a complement of forty-eight.

Service history
The U-boat completed two combat patrols in early 1945, but did not sink any ships.

Fate
U-1235 was sunk on 15 April 1945 in the North Atlantic by hedgehogs from the destroyer escorts  and  during Operation Teardrop, at position .

References

Bibliography

External links

German Type IX submarines
U-boats commissioned in 1944
U-boats sunk in 1945
World War II submarines of Germany
World War II shipwrecks in the Atlantic Ocean
U-boats sunk by depth charges
U-boats sunk by US warships
1944 ships
Ships built in Hamburg
Ships lost with all hands
Maritime incidents in April 1945